Gersheim is a municipality in the Saarpfalz district, in Saarland, Germany. It is situated near the border with France, on the river Blies, approx. 15 km southwest of Zweibrücken, and 20 km southeast of Saarbrücken.

See also 
 Medelsheim
 European Archaeological Park of Bliesbruck-Reinheim

References 

Saarpfalz-Kreis
Palatinate (region)
Mediomatrici